("The Architecture of Today") is a French architecture magazine associated with the Modernist movement.

History

Beginning 
The magazine was founded by André Bloc et Marcel Eugène Cahen in 1930 at the beginning of the recession in Europe. The latter died just before the magazine's first issue released November 1930. Its headquarters were at 5,  in Boulogne. André Bloc (1896-1966) was trained as an engineer, though he was interested in modernism and architecture.

The magazine released 10 issues annually until 1934, when it started to release 12 issues annually. Pierre Vago, a Hungarian, joined in the 1930s and was influential in developing the magazine's network of international correspondents. The magazine offered a variety of subscription types, and achieved rapid success.

In addition to its publications,  organized trips, international meetings, and exhibitions. The first international trip, open to architects and architecture enthusiasts who showed interest, was to the Soviet Union in 1931. The goal of these trips was to see the architecture and establish contacts with architects in the area. During these trips, there were days of discussion to facilitate ideas; they were called  (RIA) and were organized by the magazine's correspondent in each location.

World War II 
As André Bloc was Jewish, he could no longer manage the magazine during World War II.  became editor of the magazine after it was purchased by M. Georges Massé June 1941. Hermant and Massé chose a new name for the magazine: . Upon the liberation of France, Bloc attempted to regain control of the magazine, but was unsuccessful. He had to start from scratch in competition against .

The first issues of Bloc's reborn  came out in 1945. Up until 1949, he released 5 thematic issues annually, one of which was a double issue. The magazine quickly achieved international success again. The group was organized as the International Union of Architects in 1948.

References 

Urban studies and planning magazines
Magazines established in 1930
Architecture magazines
1930 establishments in France